The Leonine Prayers are a prescribed set of Catholic prayers for recitation by the priest and people after Low Mass required within the Roman Rite of the Latin Church from 1884 to 1965 . They are commonly called Prayers after Mass. The name derives from the fact that they were introduced by Pope Leo XIII. They were slightly modified by Pope Pius X.

Originally they were offered for the defence of the temporal sovereignty of the Holy See. After this problem was settled with the Lateran Treaty of 1929, Pope Pius XI ordered them to be said for the restoration to the people of Russia freedom to profess the Catholic faith. This gave rise to the unofficial name "Prayers for the Conversion of Russia".

The Leonine Prayers consist of three Ave Marias, a Salve Regina, a versicle and response, a prayer for the conversion of sinners and the liberty and exaltation of the Catholic Church, and a prayer to Saint Michael the Archangel. Pope Pius X permitted the addition of the invocation "Most Sacred Heart of Jesus, have mercy on us", repeated three times.

The Holy See's 26 September 1964 Inter Oecumenici, which came into force on 7 March 1965, declared "The Leonine Prayers are suppressed".

History
In 1859, Pope Pius IX, facing rebellion against his temporal sovereignty in the course of the Risorgimento, ordered that Masses celebrated in the Papal States be followed by three Ave Marias, a Salve Regina, a versicle and response, and a collect. He did not make these prayers obligatory in other countries, but did ask Catholics everywhere to pray for the defeat of those bent on destroying the Holy See's temporal sovereignty.

On 6 January 1884, in the context of anti-clerical political and social developments in the new Kingdom of Italy, Pope Leo XIII ordered that the prayers be recited throughout the world. In 1886, the prayer that follows the Salve Regina was modified to make it a prayer for the conversion of sinners and "the freedom and exaltation of Holy Mother Church". The prayer to Saint Michael was added at the same time.

Two slight changes were made later to the prayer after the Salve Regina, and in 1904, Pope Pius X granted permission to add at the conclusion of the Leonine Prayers a threefold invocation, "Most Sacred Heart of Jesus, have mercy on us", a permission that was universally availed of.

In 1929, the state of Vatican City was created, resolving the troubled relationship between the Holy See and the Italian state, which had been the object of the Leonine Prayers, and thus removing their raison d'être. But the following year, Pope Pius XI ordered that the Leonine Prayers should be offered "to permit tranquillity and freedom to profess the faith to be restored to the afflicted people of Russia". 

The 26 September 1964 Instruction Inter Oecumenici on implementing the Constitution on Sacred Liturgy of the Second Vatican Council decreed: "The Leonine Prayers are suppressed".

Rubrics

According to the original decree of 6 January 1884 that imposed the Leonine Prayers, they were to be said after every Low Mass, but later decrees, whose interpretation was not always clear, spoke rather of "private Masses", what in present-day legislation are called Masses without the people. According to one influential rubricist, the Leonine Prayers could be omitted after a Low Mass that was celebrated with special solemnity, such as an ordination or funeral Mass, a First Friday Votive Mass of the Sacred Heart, a Nuptial Mass, or the Mass after distribution of the ashes on Ash Wednesday, or if the Mass was followed immediately by function such as Benediction of the Blessed Sacrament or a Novena.

They were customarily said kneeling.

References

External links
 Leonine Prayers after Low Mass

Roman Catholic prayers
Catholic liturgy
Tridentine Mass